Shakespeare in Delaware Park is one of the largest free outdoor Shakespeare festivals in the country which takes place during summer months in Delaware Park located in the city of Buffalo, New York.  The festival attracts about 40,000 audience members each year.

Productions are performed for the public at no cost in Buffalo's Delaware Park, designed by Frederick Law Olmsted. Over 76 productions have been mounted in the 44 years that Shakespeare in Delaware Park has been running, with plays ranging from tragedies such as Romeo and Juliet, comedies like The Taming of the Shrew, and histories such as Henry IV (parts 1 and 2). The majority of actors come from the Buffalo area, and performances run Tuesday through Sunday from June through August, with dates varying each year. The shows are always performed in the evening, beginning at 7:15pm.

Shakespeare in Delaware Park is a not-for-profit, professional theatre company.

History 
Shakespeare in Delaware Park was first founded in 1976 by Saul Elkin, as a part of the University at Buffalo’s theater department.

Elkin began the project for Shakespeare in Delaware Park by asking the Mayor of the city of Buffalo to help in developing a free Shakespeare theater festival to resemble the New York Shakespeare Festival. Mayor Stanley Makowski gave permission for the performances to take place in Delaware Park, as well as pledge to fund the electricity costs for all performances (a pledge honored to this day).

Shakespeare in Delaware Park’s previous Tudor style stage was first built and designed by Gary Casarella (technical director for the University at Buffalo's Theatre department), and was constructed at the University at Buffalo with funding from the school's dean. After the construction of the stage it was marked, taken apart, and transported to Delaware Park, where it was reconstructed at the base of what is now known as "Shakespeare Hill", during the 1993 season, in time for that year's production of Romeo and Juliet. That season's first production used a temporary stage, and prior seasons used other stages.  The seating has always been the hill itself, and audience members watch the productions on blankets, lawn chairs, and other self-provided seating.

In 1991, Shakespeare in Delaware Park became a fully independent non-profit organization whose only funding comes from donations made by the public, audience members, the City of Buffalo, Erie County, and outside entities such as M&T Bank, the local NBC affiliate WGRZ-TV, the New York State Council on the Arts (NYSCA) and The Buffalo News.

The 2020 and 2021 seasons were not held in a traditional manner, due to the COVID-19 pandemic , but the company produced three touring shows ("Shakespeare's Greatest Hits: The Best of the Bard" in 2020, and "Shakespeare & Love" and "A Midsummer Night's Walk" in 2021).They were outdoor, free, touring shows for which special spacing and safety regulations were in effect and reservations were required.

Educational Activities 
The majority of roles for the productions in Shakespeare in Delaware Park are done through an audition process held at the Shakespeare in Delaware Park’s offices, before the summer season. Most actors are from the local area of Buffalo, NY and are hired seasonally, with the exception of a small troupe members who work year long with the company, performing in high schools throughout the Buffalo area.

Previous education productions include "Et Tu, Shakespeare?", "Where There’s a Will, There’s a Play!" written by the troupe members, and are hour long shows they perform for high school students that teaches parts of Shakespeare’s life, times, and Theater, by incorporating different parts of Shakespeare’s work such as his plays; "Comedy of Errors", "Midsummer Night’s Dream", and "Hamlet", and some of his sonnets. The actors will then stay after the performance to answer questions students might have about Shakespeare and his work. This small troupe of actors also provide workshops for students where they can work alongside the actors to learn different elements such as; iambic pentameter, sound, meaning, and image, and can arrange these workshops to work around a specific Shakespearean play students may be working on.

The company also offers an intense 6 day workshop that includes the performance of "Where There’s a Will, There’s a Play", the three-day workshop, and a joint performance that includes both students and troupe members from Shakespeare in Delaware Park.

Staff/Board of Directors

Staff 
 Saul Elkin: Founder/Artistic Director
 Lisa Ludwig: Managing Director
 Sean Crawford: Office Manager/Executive Assistant 
 Grace Aroune: Education & Community Outreach Associate

Board of Directors 
 Kristin M. Anderson: President
 Allison Joseph: Vice-President
 Philip G. Zuccaro: Treasurer
 Rosa Alina Pizzi: Secretary
Deborah Di Matteo
Elaine Greco
William K. Kennedy
Anne K. Kyzmir
Nathaniel W. Lucek
Robert Maefs
Biagio Patti
Emily Scioli
Norman J. Sfeir

Productions 

1976          
 The Winter's Tale

1977
 Hamlet
 As You Like It

1978
 The Tempest
 The Merry Wives of Windsor

1979
 The Comedy of Errors
 Much Ado About Nothing

1980
 A Midsummer Night’s Dream
 Richard II

1981
 Macbeth
 Twelfth Night

1982
 The Taming of the Shrew
 Henry IV, Part 1

1983
 King Lear
 Americles (an experimental adaptation of Pericles)
 Richard III

1984
 Hamlet
 Measure for Measure
 Two Gentlemen of Verona

1985
 Romeo & Juliet
 The Tempest
 Twelfth Night

1986
 Love's Labour's Lost
 The Merchant of Venice

1987
 Henry V
 All's Well That Ends Well

1988
 The Winter's Tale
 Julius Caesar

1989
 King Lear
 Much Ado About Nothing

1990 
 The Merry Wives of Windsor
 Othello

1991
 Henry IV, Part 1
 As You Like It

1992
 The Comedy of Errors
 Richard III

1993
 A Midsummer Night’s Dream
 Romeo & Juliet

1994
 Macbeth
 The Taming of the Shrew

1995
 Love's Labour's Lost
 Hamlet 
 King Lear (indoors at the Pfeiffer Theatre)

1996
 The Merchant of Venice
 Twelfth Night 
 Murder in the Cathedral (indoors at St. Andrews Episcopal Church)

1997
 Much Ado About Nothing
 Richard II

1998
 The Merry Wives of Windsor
 The Tempest

1999
 Henry IV, Part 2
 Measure for Measure

2000
 Hamlet (indoors at the Pfeiffer Theatre)
 The Winter's Tale
 As You Like It
 The Dresser (indoors at the Pfeiffer Theatre)

2001 
 Romeo & Juliet
 Julius Caesar

2002
 Macbeth
 The Comedy of Errors

2003
 A Midsummer Night’s Dream
 Much Ado About Nothing

2004
 Henry IV, Part 1
 The Taming of the Shrew

2005
 Romeo & Juliet
 Hamlet

2006
 Love's Labour's Lost
 Twelfth Night

2007
 All's Well That Ends Well
 Othello

2008
 The Merry Wives of Windsor
 King Lear

2009
 The Tempest
 Julius Caesar

2010
 Much Ado About Nothing
 Macbeth (all female cast)

2011
 The Merchant of Venice
 As You Like It

2012
 Richard III
 A Midsummer Night's Dream

2013
 Hamlet
 Measure for Measure

2014
 Henry V
 The Comedy of Errors

2015
 Romeo and Juliet
 Twelfth Night

2016
 The Winter's Tale
 The Taming of the Shrew

2017
 The Merry Wives of Windsor
 Macbeth

2018
 King Lear
 Much Ado About Nothing

2019
 The Tempest
 Love's Labour's Lost

2022
 As You Like It
 A Midsummer Night's Dream

See also 
 Shakespeare in the Park
 New York Shakespeare Festival
 Kentucky Shakespeare Festival

References

External links 
Shakespeare in Delaware Park website
Paintings by Leonard Muscarella of or related to productions of Shakespeare in Delaware Park

Festivals in Buffalo, New York
Shakespeare festivals in the United States